The women's 3000 metres steeplechase at the 2021 World Athletics U20 Championships was held at the Kasarani Stadium on 20 August.

Records

Results
The final was held on 20 August at 18:05. (KEN)

References

Steeplechase 3000 metres women
Steeplechase at the World Athletics U20 Championships
U20